Noah Naujoks (born 2 May 2002) is a Dutch footballer who plays as a midfielder for Eredivisie club Excelsior Rotterdam.

Career
Naujoks joined the Feyenoord academy in 2010 and came through their system able to play a variety of positions in midfield, but prefers to play in an attacking number 10 role. In June 2020, aged 18 he signed his first professional contract with the club to keep him under contract until 2023.

Naujoks was training and playing with the Feyenoord first team in the summer training camps in 2021. He scored in a pre-season friendly against Werder Bremen. After completing another season for the Feyenoord under-21 team, he was training with the first team again in the summer of 2022.

Naujoks was given the 27 shirt number ahead of the new 2022–23 season. Naujoks made his debut in the Eredivisie on 7 August 2022, appearing as a substitute in a 5–2 win against Vitesse at the GelreDome. According to manager Arne Slot, Naujoiks earned those playing minutes based on his performances in training.

On 23 January 2023, Naujoks signed for Eredivisie club Excelsior Rotterdam on a two-and-a-half year deal.

References

2002 births
Living people
People from Oud-Beijerland
Footballers from Amsterdam
Dutch footballers
Association football midfielders
Feyenoord players
Excelsior Rotterdam players
Eredivisie players